Weaponology is a documentary television series that premiered on November 6, 2007 on the Discovery Channel. The program also airs on the Military Channel (now American Heroes Channel). The documentary series was narrated by John Schwab.

Episode list 
The first season of the show primarily covers the history of weapons, including tanks and sniper rifles. The second season focuses on special operations groups, such as the Russian Spetsnaz American Green Berets, and the British Special Air Service, or combat engineers.

Season 1: Weapons (2007)

Season 2: Elite Units (2007–2008)

See also 
 FutureWeapons is another similar TV show broadcast on the Discovery Channel and the Military Channel.

References

External links 
 

2007 American television series debuts
2008 American television series endings
2000s American reality television series
2000s American documentary television series
Discovery Channel original programming
Television shows about weaponry
American Heroes Channel original programming